Patrick Lassine (born 28 December 1982) is a retired Luxembourgian football defender.

References

1982 births
Living people
Luxembourgian footballers
Jeunesse Esch players
Association football defenders
Luxembourg international footballers